This page discusses the post-Zero Hour reboot version of the character. For the other versions, see Princess Projectra.

Jeka Wynzorr, codenamed Sensor, is a fictional character, a superheroine in the future of the DC Comics universe, and a member of the Legion of Super-Heroes. 

She is a snake-like alien, who was later altered by "Hypertaxis energy" and Ra's al Ghul into a semi-humanoid shape, retaining her serpent's tail but gaining a humanoid upper body.

Fictional character biography
Jeka Wynzorr was the princess of the planet Orando, a world populated by a ruling class of large, sentient, snakes and an underclass of (similarly sentient) small, raccoon-like mammals. She renounced this heritage to travel the galaxy, using her illusion-casting powers to disguise herself as a humanoid to avoid attention. It is not explained how her race, which lack manual manipulators, constructed an advanced civilization, but is implied that it may have been via the enslavement of the raccoons. Upon joining the Legion, she immediately donned a set of cybernetic arms, which she was thereafter rarely seen without.

Eventually, she arrived on Earth, and chose to join in the Legion tryouts. She was accepted, alongside Magno and Umbra, and chose the codename Sensor (a homage to "Sensor Girl", Princess Projectra's later codename in the pre-Zero Hour Legion) because of her powers as a mentalist.

She served with the Legion for some time - even during their disbandment, when half the team was "Lost", she was a key component of R.J. Brande's plan to construct the artificial planetoid, Legion World, allowing them to hide the construction efforts while Brande and Cosmic Boy plotted to restart the team.

After most of the Lost members returned and the team formally reconstituted, she continued to serve with the team, until she was struck by a bolt of "Hypertaxis energy" while on Xanthu. This caused her to mutate out of control until the arch-villain Ra's al Ghul managed to stabilize her in a form rather different from her original body. Bitter after the change, she took to hiding in her quarters with the lights off, refusing to speak to anyone until she was forced out of hiding when the rest of the team (as well as everyone else on Legion World and several other planets) was enslaved by Universo, while she proved to have a natural immunity. After Shikari managed to free herself, the two were forced to use an unstable Threshold link to the planet Steeple to escape their teammates. There, they met with Ferro and Karate Kid, and the monks who resided there created crystalline necklaces which allowed her to extend her immunity to mental takeover to them. While the other three were enslaved by Universo quickly, she managed to fool him long enough to free Saturn Girl and Dreamer. With aid from Apparition and Ultra Boy's child, Cub, Saturn Girl proved able to defeat Universo, and Sensor co-nominated Dreamer for Legion membership. She is now slowly adjusting to her change of form.

In the new Legion continuity launched in 2004, Sensor has disappeared and in her place is a new version of the original, humanoid Princess Projectra.

Final Crisis
In Final Crisis: Legion of 3 Worlds #2, the reboot Legion and the "threeboot" Legion are summoned to the 31st Century of New Earth. Sensor is among the Legionnaires rescued from limbo, as Princess Projectra is a member of the threeboot Legion, and Sensor Girl is a member of the original Legion. Her original form was seen among dozens of Legionnaires pulled from alternate realities in issue #5.

Name
Sensor's first name, Jeka, is a reference to her preboot counterpart's nickname "Jeckie" (short for "Projectra"). Her surname, Wynzorr, is a reference to the House of Windsor, the current British royal family. In keeping with this, her father is King Charlz, and she has a brother named Willum, a play on King Charles III and his son William, Prince of Wales.

See also
 List of alien races in DC Comics

External links
A Hero History Of Princess Projectra/Sensor Girl

References

Characters created by Roger Stern
Comics characters introduced in 1996
DC Comics aliens
DC Comics characters with superhuman strength
DC Comics extraterrestrial superheroes
DC Comics female superheroes
Fictional princesses
Fictional snakes